William Master may refer to:

Sir William Master (MP for Cirencester)
William Master (author), his son, English divine and writer
William Master (MP for Ipswich)